is a women's football club based in Yamato, Kanagawa. They currently play in Nadeshiko League, Japan's second tier of women's league football.

Squad

Current squad

Results

Transition of team name
Yamato Sylphid 1998 : 1998 – 2013
Yamato Sylphid : 2014 – Present

References

External links
 official site
 Japanese Club Teams

Women's football clubs in Japan
Association football clubs established in 1991
1991 establishments in Japan
Sports teams in Kanagawa Prefecture
Yamato, Kanagawa